Julie Turner is an American diplomat who is the nominee to serve as special envoy on North Korean human rights issues in the United States Department of State.

Education 
Turner earned a Bachelor of Arts degree from Pepperdine University and a Master of Arts from the University of Maryland, College Park.

Career 
A career diplomat, Turner served in the Bureau of East Asian and Pacific Affairs for 16 years. She recently served as director of the Office of East Asia and the Pacific in the Bureau of Democracy, Human Rights, and Labor and was director for Southeast Asia at the United States National Security Council.

References 

Living people
American diplomats
Pepperdine University alumni
University of Maryland, College Park alumni
United States Department of State officials
North Korea–United States relations
Year of birth missing (living people)